The Battalion in the Shadows (Spanish: El batallón de las sombras) is a 1957 Spanish drama film directed by Manuel Mur Oti.

Summary 
The film narrates the dreams, hopes and passions of the inhabitants of a crowded tenement house.

Cast
 Amparo Rivelles as Magdalena 
 José Suárez as Pepe 
 Rolf Wanka
 Emma Penella as Lola
 Lída Baarová
 Félix Dafauce
 Bobby Deglané
 Albert Hehn as Soldat 
 Albert Lieven
 Katharina Mayberg
 Elisa Montés
 Fernando Nogueras
 Alicia Palacios
 Vicente Parra as Carlos 
 Lidia San Clemente as child 
 Pilar Sanclemente as Child 
 Tony Soler
 Amelia de la Torre as Doña Engracia 
 Antonio Vico

References

Bibliography 
 Mira, Alberto. Historical Dictionary of Spanish Cinema. Scarecrow Press, 2010.

External links 
 

1957 films
1957 drama films
Spanish drama films
1950s Spanish-language films
Films directed by Manuel Mur Oti
Suevia Films films
Films set in Madrid
1950s Spanish films